Make You Happy is a pre-debut extended play by Japanese girl group NiziU. It was released on June 30, 2020, by JYP Entertainment and Sony Music Entertainment Japan.

Background 
After the debut lineup of NiziU was revealed on Japanese survival reality show Nizi Project, NiziU's website was revealed. Alongside their website, their social media platforms were also opened and it was announced on June 26, 2020 that NiziU's pre-debut EP Make You Happy would be released on June 30, 2020.

Release and promotion 
On June 27, 2020, NiziU's social media accounts announced that the EP was available for pre-save and pre-order on local digital media storefronts and streaming services such as Line Music, Recochoku, Rakuten Music and AWA as well as international digital media storefronts and streaming services such as iTunes, Spotify and Apple Music. An event was also announced utilising the services in order to gain more plays.

On June 29, 2020, the short version music video (also known as PV) for "Make You Happy" was released to a bunch of Japanese news and variety morning shows such as Nippon TV's Sukkiri. Following a typical Japanese promotional cycle, the teaser for Make You Happy's music video was then released with a time announced for the official music video release being June 30, 2020, 12am JST/KST.

On June 30, 2020, the music video for "Make You Happy" was released on JYP Entertainment's official YouTube channel.

The digital pre-release EP was also released in Japan through Japanese digital storefronts and streaming services via Sony Music. Korean streaming services such as Melon also received the EP via JYP's distribution label Dreamus.

Make You Happy charted at number 1 on several Japanese streaming services as well digital storefronts on June 30, 2020.

Korean version 
"Make You Happy" (Korean version) was released  as digital single on July 15, 2020. The Korean lyrics was written by Lee Haesul.

Track listing

Charts

References 

2020 EPs
JYP Entertainment EPs
Sony Music Entertainment Japan EPs
NiziU albums